The following elections occurred in the year 1862.

 1862 Argentine presidential election
 Greek head of state referendum, 1862

North America

United States
 California's At-large congressional district
 1862 New York state election
 1862 and 1863 United States House of Representatives elections
 1862 and 1863 United States Senate elections

South America

Argentina 
 1862 Argentine presidential election

See also
 :Category:1862 elections

1862
Elections